A homestead is an isolated dwelling, especially a farmhouse, and adjacent outbuildings, typically on a large agricultural holding such as a ranch or station.

In North America the word "homestead" historically referred to land claimed by a settler or squatter under the Homestead Acts (USA) or the Dominion Lands Act (Canada). In Old English the term was used to mean a human settlement, and in Southern Africa the term is used for a cluster of several houses normally occupied by a single extended family.

In Australia it refers to the owner's house and the associated outbuildings of a pastoral property, known as a station.

See also

 Homestead principle
 Homesteading
 List of homesteads in Western Australia
 List of historic homesteads in Australia
 Settlement hierarchy

Notes

Farmhouses